Honorable Mrs. Lariba Zuweira  Abudu is a native of JANGA-FIO, born on Thursday, 12 May 1966 born to Mrs.  Abudu an Educationist  and a chief of  Fio Traditional Area. She is a member of the New Patriotic Party (NPP), Ghanaian politician, and the deputy chief executive officer of the Northern Development Authority. Honorable Lariba Zuweira Abudu was appointed to the Deputy Chief Executive Office of the Northern Development Authority in 2018 by President Akuffo-Addo. She became the member of parliament for Walewale constituency after she contested and won Walewale constituency seat in the 2020 Ghanaian General Elections.

Education 
She obtained her first degree (Special special education) in 2004 and her master's in leadership and development in 2015.

Politics 
Hon. Lariba  contested in the 2020 Ghanaian general election under the ticket of the New Patriotic Party and won. She polled 32,294 votes which represents 51.21% of the total votes cast. She was elected over Abdallah Abubakari of the National Democratic Congress and Ibrahim Mubarak of the National Democratic Party. These obtained 30,615 and 154 votes, respectively, out of the total valid votes cast. These were equivalent to 48.55% and 0.24% respectively, of total valid votes cast. She attained this victory after  defeating the incumbent Member of Parliament for the NPP,  who is also the  Deputy Minister for Agriculture in charge of Crops, Dr. Sagre Bambangi in the party's parliamentary primaries in the Walewale Constituency. She emerged winner of the 2020 primaries election and  represented the area in the 2020 parliamentary elections, while the incumbents, Dr. Sagre, Development Communications Specialist and Board Member of the Ghana Free Zones Authority, Dr. Susana Alo, Mr Yidana Zakaria, Ishaq Ibrahim an English Barrister and a communication Team member of NPP London Chapter and Mr. Seth Panwum Boyoyo were left to reconsider their political ambitions in the subsequent elections.

In August 2022, Nana Akuffo-Addo nominated  Lariba as the Minister for Gender, Children and Social Protection

Honorable Mrs. Lariba Abudu is now the minister of  gender, children and Social Security

Personal life 
She is a married woman with 3 children.

References 

1966 births
Living people
Ghanaian Muslims
21st-century Ghanaian politicians
21st-century Ghanaian women politicians
Ghanaian MPs 2021–2025
New Patriotic Party politicians